Cœur is the French word for heart, and may refer to:
 Cœurs, a 2006 French film by Alain Resnais
 Coeur (playing cards), a brand of playing card produced by VEB Altenburg in East Germany

People with the surname
 Jacques Cœur ( – 1456), 15th-century French merchant and royal treasurer
 Jacques Joli-Cœur (born 1940), Canadian politician

See also
 Coeur d'Alene (disambiguation)
 Coeur de Lion (disambiguation)
 Coeurl, a fictional extraterrestrial species invented by A. E. van Vogt
 Francoeur (surname)
 Richard Coeur-de-lion (disambiguation)